Scopula turbulentaria, the dotted ochre wave, is a moth of the  family Geometridae. It is found in southern Russia, Albania, Romania, Greece, North Macedonia and Italy and on Sardinia, Sicily, Crete, Cyprus, as well as in Turkey.

The wingspan is 18–19 mm.

The larvae feed on Nicotiana  species, Plantago lanceolata and other low-growing plants.

Taxonomy
The species was formerly treated as a subspecies of Scopula turbidaria.

References

Moths described in 1870
turbulentaria
Moths of Europe
Moths of Asia